Al-Fotuwa Sports Club is a Syrian professional football club based in Deir ez-Zor.

History
The club was founded in 1930 as Ghazi Club and 1950 renamed in Al Fotuwa Sports Club.

Achievements
Syrian League: 2
Champion : 1990, 1991

Syrian Cup: 4
Champion: 1988, 1989, 1990, 1991

Performance in AFC competitions
Asian Club Championship: 1 appearance
1989: Qualifying Stage

Current squad

Notable coaches
 Osama Al Ghabad (2013–2015)

Notes

External links
 Syrian league – Etisalat news

 
Futowa
Association football clubs established in 1950
1950 establishments in Syria
Deir ez-Zor